Bennettsville is a city located in the U.S. state of South Carolina on the Great Pee Dee River. As the county seat of Marlboro County, Bennettsville is noted for its historic homes and buildings from the 19th and early 20th centuries—including the Bennettsville Historic District which is listed on the National Register of Historic Places.

According to the 2010 census, Bennettsville has a population of 9,069.

Geography

History

The city of Bennettsville was founded in 1819 on the Great Pee Dee River and named after Thomas Bennett, Jr., then governor of South Carolina. The area was developed for short-staple cotton cultivation, dependent on the labor of enslaved African Americans. Many were brought to the upland area from the Lowcountry, carrying their Gullah culture with them. Others were transported from the Upper South by slave traders. This shift to cotton cultivation in the uplands was based on the development of the cotton gin, which made short-staple cotton, cotton with relatively short fibers, profitable. The advent of the gin in turn led to development of large cotton plantations throughout the Deep South.

In the same year, the S.C. General Assembly authorized the relocation of the courthouse from the eastern bank of the Great Pee Dee River to a more central location, selecting a  apple orchard located on a bluff above Crooked Creek. The new courthouse was designed by South Carolina architect Robert Mills. Streets were developed radiating courthouse square, one of the state's largest. In 1852, the Mills building was replaced.

In 1865 during the last year of the Civil War, the city was occupied by Union troops. During this time, the Jennings-Brown House and the first County Courthouse were used as the headquarters for General William T. Sherman. The new courthouse escaped burning. This is one of the few county seats that has preserved records dating to 1785; they are available for genealogical research.

In 1884, another Second Empire-style courthouse was built on the site. In 1952-1954 it was later enlarged with additions, and the 1884 portion constitutes the central portion of the current building. Additions included two-story red brick wings and the present clock steeple, all designed by Bennettsville architect Henry D. Harrall.

In 1885, Duncan Donald McColl financed development of the first railroad, bank and textile mills in Bennettsville, stimulating the economy as the town was connected to other markets and built an industry. The economy boomed during this "king cotton" era. The city became the center of one of the richest agricultural areas in the state. In the 20th century, the State of South Carolina designated Bennettsville as one its first "G.R.E.A.T. Town" (Governor's Rural Economic Achievement Trophy).

Registered historic sites

Buildings and districts listed on the National Register of Historic Places include Appin, the Bennettsville Historic District, Jennings-Brown House, Magnolia, Robertson-Easterling-McLaurin House, and the nearby Welsh Neck-Long Bluff-Society Hill Historic District.

The Bennettsville Historic District was designated and is listed on the National Register of Historic Places in 1978. Its contributing buildings include the Jennings-Brown House (1826), the Female Academy (1830), the Medical Museum (1902), and the Murchison School (1902), as well as other residences in the Queen Anne and Beaux Arts style.

Facilities
In the 21st century, a new Marlboro County library was constructed. Named in honor of national activist Marian Wright Edelman, who was born and grew up in Bennettsville, it opened on February 22, 2010. She founded the Children's Defense Fund, to promote programs for children and mothers.

Its front tower is oriented on axis with that of the Murchison Building. The building's cost was supported by $1.325 million in federal funding. The Library holds 60,000 volumes and has two conference rooms, seating 50 and 12.

Economy
The county is still largely rural, with limited job opportunities. The county seat serves as a trading center for the county.

The Federal Correctional Institution, Bennettsville was built outside of the city in the county. It is a medium-security prison for male prisoners, and has an associated minimum-security camp holding 139 prisoners. Together the facility houses 1776 prisoners.

Demographics

2020 census

As of the 2020 United States census, there were 7,020 people, 2,850 households, and 1,684 families residing in the city.

2000 census
As of the census of 2000, there were 9,425 people, 3,289 households, and 2,167 families residing in the city. The population density was 1,686.2 people per square mile (651.0/km2). There were 3,775 housing units at an average density of 675.4 per square mile (260.7/km2). The racial makeup of the city was 63.15% African American, 34.80% White, 0.85% Native American, 0.50% Asian, 0.11% from other races, and 0.59% from two or more races. Hispanic or Latino of any race were 0.63% of the population.

There were 3,289 households, out of which 29.5% had children under the age of 18 living with them, 35.7% were married couples living together, 25.4% had a female householder with no husband present, and 34.1% were non-families. 31.5% of all households were made up of individuals, and 14.2% had someone living alone who was 65 years of age or older. The average household size was 2.43 and the average family size was 3.06.

In the city, the population was spread out, with 23.1% under the age of 18, 10.5% from 18 to 24, 31.2% from 25 to 44, 20.8% from 45 to 64, and 14.5% who were 65 years of age or older. The median age was 36 years. For every 100 females, there were 107.6 males. For every 100 females age 18 and over, there were 110.6 males.

The median income for a household in the city was $22,389, and the median income for a family was $29,272. Males had a median income of $24,697 versus $21,054 for females. The per capita income for the city was $13,917. About 22.0% of families and 27.2% of the population were below the poverty line, including 39.2% of those under age 18 and 22.1% of those age 65 or over.

Bennettsville is the center of an urban cluster with a total population of 12,070 (2000 census).

Government 
The city is run by an elected  Mayor-council government system. The city administrator is appointed by the city council and serves as the chief executive officer to carry out policies and oversee the daily business of the city.  The mayor is Carolyn A. Prince, PhD, and council members include Sandy Donaldson, Tyrone R. Davis, Allen Taylor, Tyron Abraham, Gregory Scott, and Jean Quick.

Education
Bennettsville has a lending library, the Marian Wright Edelman Public Library.

Notable people
Thomas Carey (baritone), American operatic baritone
Aziz Ansari, comedian and actor
Marian Wright Edelman, founder of the Children's Defense Fund 
Scott Howell, American political consultant 
Hugh McColl, retired CEO of Bank of America
Cozell McQueen, Starting Center on 1983 NC State NCAA Championship Team
Jim Odom, MLB umpire
Mike Wright, pitcher for Seattle Mariners
Chancellor Williams, historian, writer and educator

References

External links
 Official city website
 Visit Bennettsville.com
 Bennettsville historic sites - Marlboro County

Cities in South Carolina
Cities in Marlboro County, South Carolina
County seats in South Carolina
Populated places established in 1819
1819 establishments in South Carolina